The Cambridge Student, commonly known as TCS, is one of Cambridge University's student newspapers (Varsity and The Tab are the others). The now online only newspaper is owned and published by the Cambridge University Students' Union (CUSU).

The paper was founded in October 1999 and once produced a weekly print run of 10,000 copies during university term time.

The paper has interviewed public figures including United Nations Weapons Inspector Hans Blix, director Ridley Scott, politician Ian Paisley, the BBC's security correspondent Frank Gardner and journalist David Frost.

Since then, it made national headlines with news of animal rights abuses at the university. The newspaper's photography of the tuition fee riots also won plaudits. In March 2011 the paper became embroiled in controversy when its Editor, Philip Brook, forged a letter insinuating unfounded sexual allegations against a fictional fellow at St. John's.

In April 2016, TCS announced that CUSU was preparing to pass a budget which would cut its print funding, and turn it into an online newspaper, with occasional print editions. Sections of an internal letter, leaked to Varsity, said that CUSU had ended up in a "difficult situation" financially, which lead to the need for cuts. The budget was ratified at a meeting of CUSU's council on 16 May 2016, bringing TCS's print run to an end. despite enjoying a brief fortnightly reappearance in print following widespread negative coverage of its student union publisher over the issue in October 2018 the print run of TCS was confirmed to have been ended following ongoing reports of huge losses incurred by Cambridge University Students' Union over a number of years.

References

External links
 

Publications associated with the University of Cambridge
Student magazines published in the United Kingdom
Student newspapers published in the United Kingdom
Publications established in 1999
Free newspapers
Weekly newspapers published in the United Kingdom
Newspapers published in Cambridgeshire
1999 establishments in the United Kingdom